The Affairs of Annabel is a 1938 comedy film directed by Benjamin Stoloff and starring Lucille Ball and Jack Oakie. The film was followed by the sequel Annabel Takes a Tour the same year, also starring Oakie, Ball and Donnelly.

Plot
Wonder Pictures studio publicity man Lanny Morgan has actress Annabel Allison taken to prison in order to generate publicity before the release of her new film. However, when Annabel is released one month later, she finds that nobody has noticed, and she has Lanny fired. But when he pays a struggling actress to pretend to be his sick mother, Annabel has Lanny rehired, and he immediately begins plotting his next stunt.

The head of Wonder Pictures informs Annabel that her film has been canceled, and that she is to star in a new film, The Maid and the Man. Lanny arranges to have her work as Mary, a maid for the Fletchers, their teenage son Robert and inventor Major. While Robert becomes infatuated with Annabel, she is expected to cook and clean for the family, so she calls on Lanny to help. Meanwhile, the investors interested in one of Major's inventions, a rubber ring placed around a plate so that it will bounce rather than break when dropped, appear in the morning newspaper as robbers. They are in fact waiting for their own publicity to dissipate so that they can make a getaway.

Back at Wonder Pictures, The Maid and the Man has been scrapped, but when Lanny calls Annabel to tell her, she answers that she cannot leave. Though at first confused, he finds Annabel's police mug shot in the paper along with the robbers, and forms a plan to outfit 50 extras as policemen. As they march toward the house firing blanks, the robbers return fire with real bullets, and the extras scatter. Lanny sneaks into the house alone but is captured.

When the real policemen arrive, the robbers try to escape, using Lanny and Allison as shields. Instead, Annabel uses her martial arts training to throw one of the robbers to the ground, while Lanny bites the other.

Annabel returns to Wonder Pictures and is disappointed to find that The Maid and the Man has been replaced by The Diamond Smuggler, in which she is to play the lead. On her way out, Annabel collects a gift that Lanny had arranged for her to receive, and is apprehended when the police open it to discover the precious jewels inside. Lanny watches from the front of the new billboard for The Diamond Smuggler as Annabel is driven away screaming.

Cast 
 Jack Oakie as Lanny Morgan 
 Lucille Ball as Annabel Allison 
 Ruth Donnelly as Josephine 
 Bradley Page as Howard Webb 
 Fritz Feld as Vladimir Dukov 
 Thurston Hall as Major 
 Elisabeth Risdon as Mrs. Margaret Fletcher 
 Granville Bates as Jim Fletcher 
 James Burke as Officer Muldoon 
 Lee Van Atta as Robert Fletcher 
 Anthony Warde as Bailey aka Rogers 
 Leona Roberts as Mrs. Hurley 
 Charles Coleman as The Butler, Perkins 
 Brooks Benedict as Man in Webb's Office  
 Stanley Blystone as Cop 
 Maurice Cass as Dr. Rubnick  
 Claire Du Brey as Convict 
 Mildred Gover as Scarlet, the Maid  
 Kane Richmond as Detective  
 Madame Sul-Te-Wan as Benzedrina, a Convict 
 John Sutton as Man at newsstand

Reception 
In a contemporary review for The New York Times, critic Frank S. Nugent speculated that The Affairs of Annabel would be the first in a series: "A promising first, we might add; in a light farce vein, with some flip players in it. ... Between them, and with the help of a smartly written script, they have created an amusing trifle about a movie actress and a press agent with a Svengali complex. ... Miss Ball, who is rapidly becoming one of our brightest comediennes, plays it broadly and without a disruptive trace of whimsy."

References

External links
 
 
 
 

1938 films
American black-and-white films
1938 comedy films
Films directed by Benjamin Stoloff
American comedy films
Films about actors
RKO Pictures films
Films about filmmaking
1930s American films